Jeffrey Burton Russell (born 1934) is an American historian and religious studies scholar.

Early life
Russell received his undergraduate degree from the University of California, Berkeley in 1955 and his PhD from Emory University in 1960.

Career
He is currently Professor Emeritus of History at the University of California, Santa Barbara. He has also taught History and Religious Studies at Berkeley, Riverside, California State University, Sacramento, Harvard, New Mexico, and Notre Dame.

Russell has published widely, mostly in medieval European history and the history of theology. His first book was Dissent and Reform in the Early Middle Ages (1965). He is most noted for his five-volume history of the concept of the Devil: The Devil (1977), Satan (1981), Lucifer (1984), Mephistopheles (1986) and The Prince of Darkness (1988).

In Inventing the Flat Earth (1991) he argues that 19th century anti-Christians invented and spread the falsehood that educated people in the Middle Ages believed that the earth was flat. As one writer summarizes, "Russell also examined a large selection of textbooks and found those written before 1870 usually included the correct account, but most textbooks written after 1880 uncritically repeated the erroneous claims in Washington Irving, John William Draper and Andrew Dickson White. Russell concludes that Irving, Draper and White were the main writers responsible for introducing the erroneous flat-earth myth that is still with us today."

Russell has also written two books on the history of the notion of Heaven: A History of Heaven: The Singing Silence (1997), which deals with the period from around 200 B.C. up to Dante, and Paradise Mislaid (2006), which takes the story up to the present day.

Works
The Library of Congress lists 18 books written by Russell:
 Dissent and Reform in the Early Middle Ages (1965, 1982, 1992)
 Medieval Civilization (1968)
 History of Medieval Christianity: Prophecy & Order (1968, 1986, 2000)
 Religious Dissent in the Middle Ages (edited by Jeffrey B. Russell) (1971)
 Witchcraft in the Middle Ages (1972)
 The Devil: Perceptions of Evil from Antiquity to Primitive Christianity (1977)
 History of Witchcraft, Sorcerers, Heretics, and Pagans (1980, 2007)
 Medieval Heresies: a Bibliography, 1960-1979 (with Carl T. Berkhout) (1981)
 Satan: The Early Christian Tradition (1981)
 Lucifer: The Devil in the Middle Ages (1984)
 Mephistopheles: The Devil in the Modern World (1986)
 The Prince of Darkness: Radical Evil and the Power of Good in History (1988)
 Inventing the Flat Earth: Columbus and Modern Historians (1991)
 History of Heaven: the Singing Silence (1997)
 "Devil, Heresy, and Witchcraft in the Middle Ages" in Essays in Honor of Jeffrey B. Russell (edited by Alberto Ferreiro) (1998)
 Life of the Jura Fathers: The Life and Rule of the Holy Fathers Romanus, Lupicinus, and Eugendus, Abbots of the Monasteries in the Jura Mountains (1999)
 Paradise Mislaid: How We Lost Heaven—and How We Can Regain It (2006)
 Exposing Myths about Christianity: A Guide to Answering 145 Viral Lies and Legends (2012)

Articles by Russell include:
 "Flattening the Earth" (2002)

Book reviews by Russell include:
 "Satan: A Biography" (2007)
 "Bad to the Bone" (2008)
 "A God of the Times" (2009)

Honors and accolades
Fulbright Fellow
Harvard Junior Fellow
Guggenheim Fellow (1968)

References

External links
 University of California, Santa Barbara: Jeffrey Burton Russell
 Encyclopædia Britannica: Jeffrey Burton Russell
 The Veritas Forum: Jeffrey Burton Russell
 
 New York Times: excerpt from A History of Heaven: The Singing Silence

1934 births
Living people
University of California, Berkeley alumni
Emory University alumni
University of California, Santa Barbara faculty
University of California, Berkeley faculty
University of California, Riverside faculty
Harvard University faculty
University of New Mexico faculty
University of Notre Dame faculty
Medievalists
American historians of religion
American Christian writers
Critics of atheism
21st-century American historians
21st-century American male writers
Historians from California
American male non-fiction writers